Norway was represented by 38 athletes (17 men and 21 women) at the 2010 European Athletics Championships held in Barcelona, Spain.

Participants

Results

References 
Participants list

Nations at the 2010 European Athletics Championships
2010
European Athletics Championships